Communist Party of Castile–León (Leonese: Partido Comunista de Castiella Llión), is the federation of the Communist Party of Spain (PCE) in Castile and León.

External links
Partido Comunista de Castilla León

Castile-Leon
Political parties in Castile and León
Political parties with year of establishment missing